Memphis is a city that straddles the border between Macomb and St. Clair counties in the U.S. state of Michigan. The population was 1,084 at the 2020 census.

History
The first European Americans to settle in the area of Memphis were members of the Wells family from Albany, New York; Anthony Wells resided here from 1834 and James Wells from 1835. The fledgling community was originally called Wells Settlement after them.

The name "Memphis" was chosen and applied in 1848 when a US Post Office was established. The village was named for its location on a bluff overlooking the Belle River, which settlers likened to the position of the ancient Egyptian Memphis, "the City on the Nile". Memphis was incorporated as a village on 4 April 1865. It did not attain the status of a city until 1953.

The area was originally developed for agriculture, as most settlers were farmers. As lumbering became a major industry in Michigan, log rafts were floated down the Belle River into the St. Clair River, and south to Detroit. Some lumber was processed in Memphis and Marine City, Michigan, where there was a major shipbuilding industry. Much was shipped to developing midwestern cities such as Chicago and further east.

Geography
The city is evenly divided between Macomb and St. Clair counties, and developed on both sides of the Belle River.

Demographics

As of 2000 the median income for a household in the city was $41,705, and the median income for a family was $52,679. Males had a median income of $41,932 versus $27,019 for females. The per capita income for the city was $19,983.  About 7.8% of families and 10.0% of the population were below the poverty line, including 10.5% of those under age 18 and 15.9% of those age 65 or over.

2010 census
As of the census of 2010, there were 1,183 people, 474 households, and 320 families residing in the city. The racial makeup of the city was 97.6% White, 0.8% African American, 0.3% Native American, 0.5% from other races, and 0.8% from two or more races. Hispanic or Latino of any race were 2.1% of the population.

There were 474 households, of which 34.8% had children under the age of 18 living with them, 49.8% were married couples living together, 13.9% had a female householder with no husband present, 3.8% had a male householder with no wife present, and 32.5% were non-families. 27.8% of all households were made up of individuals, and 11.9% had someone living alone who was 65 years of age or older. The average household size was 2.47 and the average family size was 3.02.

The median age in the city was 39.4 years. 24.3% of residents were under the age of 18; 7.9% were between the ages of 18 and 24; 26% were from 25 to 44; 27.9% were from 45 to 64; and 13.8% were 65 years of age or older. The gender makeup of the city was 47.8% male and 52.2% female.

Education
The Memphis Community School District operates an elementary school and a junior/senior high school.  Its sports teams are nicknamed the Yellowjackets.

Maryglade College was located in Memphis from 1960 until May 1972.

"The Thing"

References

External links

City of Memphis Official Website
Memphis Community School District

Cities in Macomb County, Michigan
Cities in St. Clair County, Michigan
Populated places established in 1834
1834 establishments in Michigan Territory